Development Bank of Kenya is a commercial bank in Kenya. It is licensed by the Central Bank of Kenya, the central bank and national banking regulator.

Overview
Development Bank of Kenya is a medium-sized financial institution providing an array of financial services to both individuals and businesses. , the total asset valuation of the bank was approximately US$180 million (KES:15.58 billion), with shareholder's equity of about US$21 million (KES:1.822 billion). At that time, the bank was ranked number 26, by assets, among the 43 licensed banks in Kenya.

History
Development Bank of Kenya was established in 1963 as a non-banking financial institution. Its primary focus at that time was to promote and develop commercially viable projects in Kenya. In 1964, it began financing development projects as a development finance institution. As part of the banking reforms of 1996, it converted to a commercial bank and began accepting customer deposits.

Ownership
Shareholding in Development Bank of Kenya at its inception included (a) the Government of Kenya, through the Industrial and Commercial Development Corporation, (b) the British Government, through Commonwealth Development Corporation and (c) the Government of Germany, through the German Investment Corporation. In 1967, the Dutch Government, through the Netherlands Development Finance Company, became the fourth shareholder. In 1981, the World Bank, through the International Finance Corporation, became the fifth shareholder. Over the years, the non-Kenyan shareholders have divested from the bank and shareholding as depicted in the table below:

Branch network
, the bank maintains its headquarters in Nairobi, Kenya's capital and largest city. It has one branch on the ground floor of its headquarters building.
 Main branch -  Finance House, Loita Street, Nairobi

See also
 List of banks in Kenya
 Central Bank of Kenya
 Economy of Kenya

References

External links
Website of Development Bank of Kenya
Website of Central Bank of Kenya

 

Banks of Kenya
Banks established in 1963
Companies based in Nairobi
Kenyan companies established in 1963